Mapaseka Mpuru (born 9 April 1998) is a South African football goalkeeper. She plays for Tuks LFC and the South Africa women's national football team.

Playing career 
She played with the U20 national team; Mpuru is then named in 2019 to take part in the 2019 FIFA Women's World Cup.

References

Living people
1998 births
Women's association football goalkeepers
South African women's soccer players
South Africa women's international soccer players
2019 FIFA Women's World Cup players